Giorgio Gusmini (9 December 1855  – 24 August 1921) was a Cardinal of the Roman Catholic Church who served as Archbishop of Bologna.

Biography
Giorgio Gusmini was born in Gazzaniga, Italy as the son of Santo Gusmini and Maddalena Cagnoni. His father died when Giorgio was only five years old. He was educated at the local diocesan Seminary of Bergamo, from 1869 until 1875, when he was sent to Rome to study at the Pontifical Roman Athenaeum S. Apollinare Rome. On 7 July 1878 he obtained a doctorate in theology.

Priesthood
He was ordained to the priesthood on 8 September 1878. He served as the Professor of letters and philosophy at the Seminary of Bergamo from 1882 until 1888. He was transferred to serve as the Professor of letters, philosophy and history at Collegio San Alessandro, Bergamo, where he stayed until 1890. He also worked in pastoral care in the diocese of Bergamo from 1878 to 1880. He was one of the founders of Società Cattolica Universitaria, now F.U.C.I. He returned to pastoral work in Bergamo from 1888 to 1910. He served as Archpriest and vicar forane in Clusone in 1902. He was created Privy chamberlain supra numerum on 16 December 1901 and was reappointed on 20 October 1903.

Episcopate
Pope Pius X appointed him as bishop of Foligno on 15 April 1910. He was consecrated on 17 May 1910, Bergamo, by Giacomo Radini-Tedeschi, Bishop of Bergamo. He spent four years in Foligno, until he was promoted to fill the vacancy in the metropolitan see of Bologna that resulted from the elevation of Giacomo della Chiesa to the Papacy.

Cardinalate
He was created and proclaimed Cardinal-Priest of Santa Susanna in the first consistory of the newly elected pope, Benedict XV that was held on 6 December 1915.

He died in 1921 after a long illness. The funeral took place on 25 August in the metropolitan cathedral of Bologna.

References

1855 births
1921 deaths
20th-century Italian cardinals
20th-century Italian Roman Catholic archbishops
Roman Catholic archbishops of Bologna
Bishops of Foligno